Mischer may refer to:

 Don Mischer(born 1940), American producer
 Mischer Neuroscience Institute, in Texas, United States

See also 
 Misher (disambiguation)
 Mishar (disambiguation)
 Mischler (disambiguation)